The year 1742 in science and technology involved some significant events.

Astronomy
 January 14 – Death of Edmond Halley; James Bradley succeeds him as Astronomer Royal in Great Britain.

Mathematics
 June – Christian Goldbach produces Goldbach's conjecture.
 Colin Maclaurin publishes his Treatise on Fluxions in Great Britain, the first systematic exposition of Newton's methods.

Metrology
 Anders Celsius publishes his proposal for a centigrade temperature scale originated in 1741.

Physiology and medicine
 Surgeon Joseph Hurlock publishes his A Practical Treatise upon Dentition, or The breeding of teeth in children in London, the first treatise in English on dentition.

Technology
 Benjamin Robins publishes his New Principles of Gunnery, containing the determination of the force of gun-powder and an investigation of the difference in the resisting power of the air to swift and slow motions in London, containing a description of his ballistic pendulum and the results of his scientific experiments into improvements in ballistics.
 The first large (12 ft focal length) reflecting telescope is made, in Gregorian form, by James Short, for use by Charles Spencer, 3rd Duke of Marlborough, in London.

Awards
 Copley Medal: Christopher Middleton.

Births
 March 15 (bapt.) – John Stackhouse, English botanist (died 1819).
 May 18 – Lionel Lukin, English inventor (died 1834).
 December 3 – James Rennell, English geographer, historian and oceanographer (died 1830).
 December 9 – Carl Wilhelm Scheele, Swedish chemist (died 1786).
 December 26 – Ignaz von Born, Hungarian metallurgist (died 1791).

Deaths
 January 14 – Edmond Halley, English astronomer, geophysicist, mathematician, meteorologist, and physicist (born 1656).
 February 28 – Willem 's Gravesande, Dutch polymath (born 1688).
 May 13 – Nicolas Andry, French physician (born 1658).
 September 22 – Frederic Louis Norden, Danish explorer (born 1708).

References

 
18th century in science
1740s in science